Lamina basalis can refer to:
 Basal lamina (extracellular matrix layer)
 Basal plate (placenta)
 Basal plate (neural tube)
 Bruch's membrane (lamina basalis choroideae)